Anthony Mora may refer to:

Anthony Mora (public relations) (born 1951), American writer
Anthony Mora (born 1977), Mexican American boxer, brother of Adrian Mora